Mohamed El Moustaoui or Moustaoui (born 1943) is a Moroccan poet and songwriter in Tachelhit.

Biography 
Mohamed was born in 1943 in Mekzert, a small village in Souss. He studied in Taroudant and Marrakech. He was correspondent for the Al Ittihad Al Ichtiraki, the official newspaper of the USFP party.

He was one of the first modern writers to write in Tamazight.

In 2003, he retired from university teaching.

Bibliography
 Chains (Iskraf) in 1976;
 Laughter and cying (Tadsa d imttawen) in 1979;
 Dancing scene (asays) in 1988;
 The waves (taddangiwin) in 1998;
 The old have said (nnan willi zrinin) 1980;
 Abouch in parliament in 1983;
 Lights (tifawin ) in 1985;
 Testimonies and poem of fire rrays El Haj Mohamed Albensir  in 1998;
 Rrays El Haj Belaid : his life in a few poems in 1996;
 Poems of rrays Said Achtouk (the poet Said Achtouk, (-1989)) (published in collaboration with Ahmed Assid ) in 1998.

See also 
 Omar Wahrouch
 Said Achtouk
 Mohamed Demsiri

References

Berber poets
Moroccan writers
Moroccan songwriters
Living people
People from Souss-Massa
Shilha people
1943 births